Miller & Chevalier is a Washington, D.C. law firm founded in 1920. They have practices in Tax, Employee Benefits (including ERISA), International Law and Business, White Collar and Internal Investigations, Complex Litigation, and Government Affairs.

Miller & Chevalier is located at 900 16th Street NW, Washington, DC 20006.

Paul Manafort attorney Kevin Downing 

Partner Kevin M. Downing left the firm in 2017, two weeks after becoming the attorney for Paul Manafort.

References

External links
 Official website

Law firms based in Washington, D.C.
Law firms established in 1920